Olga Viktorovna Zavyalova, née Korneyeva (born August 24, 1972 in Leningrad) is a Russian cross-country skier who competed from 1993 to 2010. She won six medals at the FIS Nordic World Ski Championships with two gold (30 km: 2003, 7.5 km + 7.5 km double pursuit: 2007), one silver (10 km: 2007), and three bronzes (5 km + 5 km double pursuit, 15 km, and 4 × 5 km relay: all in 2003).

Zavyalova's best individual finish at the Winter Olympics was seventh in the 7.5 km + 7.5 km double pursuit in Turin in 2006. She has twelve additional individual victories at distances up to 30 km from 1996 to 2006.

Zayalova took the 2007-08 season off due to pregnancy, but returned for the 2008-09 season.

Since her retirement after the 2010 Winter Olympics, Zayalova has been acting as a sports ambassador for the 2014 Winter Olympics in Sochi.

Cross-country skiing results
All results are sourced from the International Ski Federation (FIS).

Olympic Games

World Championships
 6 medals – (2 gold, 1 silver, 3 bronze)

a.  Cancelled due to extremely cold weather.

World Cup

Season standings

Individual podiums
1 victory – (1 ) 
15 podiums – (14 , 1 )

Team podiums

 7 victories – (6 , 1 ) 
 23 podiums – (19 , 4 )

References

 FIS Newsflash 177 on Zavyalova's return from pregnancy. April 30, 2008.

External links
 

1972 births
Cross-country skiers at the 2002 Winter Olympics
Cross-country skiers at the 2006 Winter Olympics
Cross-country skiers at the 2010 Winter Olympics
Living people
Olympic cross-country skiers of Russia
Sportspeople from Saint Petersburg
Russian female cross-country skiers
FIS Nordic World Ski Championships medalists in cross-country skiing
Russian State University of Physical Education, Sport, Youth and Tourism alumni